Skinny Dennis Sanchez (September 3, 1946 – March 20, 1975) was a country musician in the Los Angeles area. He played the upright bass, most famously accompanying Nashville musician Guy Clark during Clark's stay in Los Angeles. His nickname is in reference to his having Marfan syndrome; Sanchez stood at 6'11", and weighed 135 lbs.

He is most famously mentioned in the Guy Clark song "L.A. Freeway" (recorded by Guy Clark on his debut album, Old No. 1 in 1975 and first recorded by Jerry Jeff Walker in 1972).  Clark's lyrics went as follows:

"Here's to you ol' Skinny Dennis
The only one I think I will miss
I can hear your ol' bass singin'
Sweet and low like a gift you're bringin'"

Sanchez was also friends with many in Clark's circle, including Townes Van Zandt, Rodney Crowell, Steve Earle, Richard Dobson and others. The country music documentary Heartworn Highways featuring those songwriters is dedicated to Sanchez. Richard Dobson recorded Sanchez' song "Bus Stop Coffee" for his albums In Texas Last December and One Bar Town.

Sanchez died at age 28 of heart failure on stage, playing the bass at Captain Jack's in Sunset Beach with John Malcolm Penn.

The Skinny Dennis Brooklyn bar in New York City is named after Sanchez.

References 

1946 births
1975 deaths
Musicians who died on stage
American double-bassists
Male double-bassists
American country bass guitarists
American male bass guitarists
People with Marfan syndrome
20th-century American bass guitarists
20th-century double-bassists
20th-century American male musicians